The girls' 1500 metres speed skating competition of the 2020 Winter Youth Olympics was held at Lake St. Moritz on 13 January 2020.

Results 
The races were held at 11:30.

References 

 

Girls' 1500m